John McEnroe and Mary Carillo defeated Iván Molina and Florența Mihai in the final, 7–6, 6–4 to win the mixed doubles tennis title at the 1977 French Open.

Kim Warwick and Ilana Kloss were the reigning champions, but did not compete this year.

Draw

Finals

Top half

Bottom half

References

External links
1977 French Open – Doubles draws and results at the International Tennis Federation

Mixed Doubles
French Open by year – Mixed doubles